The Asian Paralympic Committee (acronym: APC) is an organization based in United Arab Emirates. It has 44 National Paralympic Committees of the Asian continent as members. It organizes the Asian Para Games and is affiliated to the International Paralympic Committee.

History
The Asian Paralympic Committee was formed on 30 October 2002 in Busan, South Korea as the Asian Paralympic Council, following a motion presented by NPC Malaysia at the 1999 IPC General Assembly. It consisted originally of three sub-regions which are East Asia, South Asia and South-East Asia. In April 2004, in order to align with the structure followed by the International Olympic Committee, the International Paralympic Committee decided that the Central Asia and West Asia sub-regions fall under the council's responsibility. An agreement was signed on 16 May 2004 to merge the Asian Paralympic Council and the FESPIC Federation. The organisation was only known by its present name by 28 November 2006 when the merger came into effect.

Member countries 
In the following table, the year in which the NPC was recognized by the International Paralympic Committee (IPC) is also given if it is different from the year in which the NPC was created.

Administration

APC Presidents

Executive board
Following is the APC Executive Board for the term 2019 – 2023.

Committees

Tournaments organized
 Asian Para Games
 Asian Youth Para Games

Affiliated event
 ASEAN Para Games

See also
 Olympic Council of Asia

References

External links
 Asian Paralympic Committee - official website

Paralympic Committees
Asian Paralympic Committee
Sports organizations established in 2006
2006 establishments in Asia